The Tähtiniemi Bridge (literally "Star cape bridge") is a cable-stayed harpform bridge in Heinola, Finland. It carries the Finnish national road 4 (E75) across the Lake Ruotsalainen. The bridge was opened in November 1993.

External links 

Cable-stayed bridges in Finland
Bridges completed in 1993
Heinola
Buildings and structures in Päijät-Häme